Harvey Benge (27 July 1944 – 7 October 2019) was a New Zealand photographer who lived in Auckland and Paris. He exhibited his work in European galleries.

Life and work
Benge claimed that his photography was inspired by anything that attracted his attention while walking in the city. He stated that "the most successful photography raises questions, offers something else to the viewer".

In May 2007 he started his photo-blog called Photography + Art + Ideas on the Blogger platform to write about photography, photobooks, art and photographic concepts. He continued his writing and published his last article on June 24, 2019.

Benge's first book, Four Parts Religion, Six Parts Sin was about Auckland. His second was about the Dalai Lama's visit to New Zealand. Not Here. Not There, contains cityscapes. You Are Here (2007) chronicled his visit to Tokyo and was shortlisted for the Prix du Livre at the 2006 Rencontres d'Arles. He was twice a finalist of the award. In 2008 he started his own imprint FAQ, based in his home/studio in Auckland, NA as a publishing platform for his self-published books and zines, later including a small signed photographic print with each copy.

Benge died on 7 October 2019 at the age of 75.

Publications
Four Parts Religion, Six Parts Sin. Photoforum, New Zealand: 1993. . With an introduction by Warwick Roger.
A Celebration of Kindness: His Holiness the 14th Dalai Lama, New Zealand, September 1996. Dunedin, N.Z.: Trust for the Visit of His Holiness the Dalai Lama to New Zealand, 1996. .
Not Here. Not There. Stockport, UK: Dewi Lewis, 1998. .
Vital signs. Stockport, UK: Dewi Lewis, 2000. .
Lucky Box: a Guide to Modern Living. Stockport, UK: Dewi Lewis, 2001. .
First Ever Pictures of God. 2003. .
Performance. 2005.
Killing Time in Paradise. Cologne, Germany: Schaden, 2005. .
You Are Here. 2007. Cologne, Germany: Schaden, 2006. Edition of 275 copies.
My House, my Head. Self-published, 2007. . Edition of 200 copies.
I Look at You, You Look at Me. Auckland, NZ: FAQ, 2008. . Edition of 300 copies.
Text Book. Auckland, NZ: FAQ, 2008. . Edition of 300 copies.
Sometimes a Cigar is Just a Cigar. Auckland, NZ: FAQ, 2008. . Edition of 300 copies.
You Won't be with me Tomorrow. Auckland, NZ: FAQ, 2009. .
Small Anarchies from Home. Auckland, NZ: FAQ, .
Against Forgetting. Auckland, NZ: FAQ, . Edition of 100 copies.
All the Places I've Ever Known. Heidelberg, Germany: Kehrer, 2010. .
As it is? in Four Chapters. Auckland, NZ: FAQ, 2010. .
Some of John's Friends. Auckland, NZ: FAQ, 2011. .
Truth and Various Deceptions. Auckland, NZ: FAQ, 2011. .
Skytower. Auckland, NZ: FAQ, 2011. . Edition of 50 copies.
Paris Diary, November 2010. Auckland, NZ: FAQ, 2011. . Edition of 75 copies.
Three Days in Kassel in June. Auckland, NZ: FAQ, 2011. .
Cologne Stopover, June 2011. Auckland, NZ: FAQ, 2011. .
Rome Pocket Guide. Auckland, NZ: FAQ, 2011. .
Still Looking for it. Auckland, NZ: FAQ, 2011. . Edition of 75 copies.
Sri Lanka Diary, February 2011. Auckland, NZ: FAQ, 2011. . Edition of 75 copies.
Some Things You Should Have Told Me. Stockport, UK: Dewi Lewis, 2013.
Paris, November 2013. Auckland, NZ: FAQ, 2013. . Edition of 50 copies.
HB/AKL/MEL/SYD/AKL/21-26/5/2014 /. Auckland, NZ: FAQ, 2014. .
You Won't be with me Tomorrow. Stockport, UK: Dewi Lewis,  2014. .
Not Food or Sex. Auckland, NZ: FAQ, 2015. . Edition of 50 copies.
Un-solved Puzzles Re-main. FAQ, Auckland: 2015. . Edition of 50 copies.
The Month Before Trump. FAQ, Self-published, Auckland, NZ, 2017. Edition of 50 copies.
The Lament. Stockport, UK: Dewi Lewis, 2017. .
Home Town Dream. Auckland, NZ: FAQ, 2017. Edition of 50 copies.

References

External links

"Photos are more than captured moments" from The New Zealand Herald
List of publications from WorldCat

New Zealand photographers
2019 deaths
1944 births
Photographers from Auckland